Georges-Francis "Johnny" Servoz-Gavin (18 January 1942 – 29 May 2006) was a French motor racing driver in both sportscars and single seaters.

He participated in 13 Formula One World Championship Grands Prix between 1967 and 1970, failing to qualify in one. He achieved one podium, and scored a total of nine championship points. He drove for the Tyrrell Formula One team, mainly as Jackie Stewart's teammate.

Early life
Servoz-Gavin was born in Grenoble, a city in the foothills of the Alps. As a teenager he worked as a ski instructor, during which time he became known as "Johnny".

Career

Lower formulae
Servoz-Gavin's early work included developing sports cars for Matra. After initially competing in rallying, Servoz-Gavin moved to single-seater racing. He had previously attended the racing drivers' school at the Magny-Cours circuit in the centre of France, (from which he was "thrown out") and in 1965 entered the French Formula Three Championship in a private Brabham BT18. By the late 1960s, Servoz-Gavin was a rising star, following in the footsteps of Jacky Ickx and Jean-Pierre Beltoise. He became French Formula Three Champion in 1966 driving a works Matra MS5, and in 1969 he won the European Formula Two Championship.

Formula One
His Formula Three racing performances won Servoz-Gavin the attention of Matra, resulting in his moving into Formula One. His best season was 1968, particularly the 1968 Italian Grand Prix in which he finished second and scored six points, driving a Matra. He also impressed at the Monaco Grand Prix, entering as Jackie Stewart's stand-in, starting from the front row of the grid, and leading from Graham Hill at the start, until his race ended early after clipping a barrier and breaking a driveshaft in a similar incident to the one that resulted in the death of Lorenzo Bandini in the Monaco Grand Prix the previous year. Next year, he also scored a sixth place in the 1969 Canadian Grand Prix at Mosport Park, which secured him a place in history as the only driver ever to score a world championship point with a four-wheel-driven Formula One car, the Matra MS84.

Servoz-Gavin suffered an eye injury in an off-road event in the winter of 1969–70, and had been worrying that his eyesight had been damaged. Driving a March 701, for the Tyrrell team he finished fifth (yet last) in the 1970 Spanish Grand Prix at Jarama. Then after hitting a barrier again, and failing to qualify for the 1970 Monaco Grand Prix he decided to retire. Servoz-Gavin felt that the risks inherent in Formula One and racing in general were not worthwhile but the problems with his vision may have influenced his decision.

Other motorsport interests
In 1969, Servoz-Gavin participated in Matra endurance events, co-driving with Pedro Rodríguez.

Later life
A man of good looks and high society, he was among a number of Formula One drivers rumoured to be the unknown driver in Claude Lelouch's 1977 short footage film C'était un rendez-vous, although Lelouch claimed to have driven the car himself.

After his racing career was over, Servoz-Gavin lived on a houseboat and suffered serious burns when a gas bottle exploded on his boat in 1982. He died in May 2006 as the result of a pulmonary embolism, following a period of ill health. He was 64 years old.

Racing record

24 Hours of Le Mans results

Complete European Formula Two Championship results
(key) (Races in bold indicate pole position; races in italics indicate fastest lap)

Complete Formula One World Championship results
(key)

References

1942 births
2006 deaths
French racing drivers
French Formula One drivers
Matra Formula One drivers
Cooper Formula One drivers
Tyrrell Formula One drivers
European Formula Two Championship drivers
French Formula Three Championship drivers
24 Hours of Le Mans drivers
Sportspeople from Grenoble
World Sportscar Championship drivers